Case Western Reserve University School of Law is one of eight schools at Case Western Reserve University in Cleveland, Ohio. It was one of the first schools accredited by the American Bar Association. It is a member of the Association of American Law Schools (AALS). It was initially named for Franklin Thomas Backus, a justice of the Ohio Supreme Court, whose widow donated $50,000 to found the school in 1892.

According to Case Western Reserve's official 2018 ABA-required disclosures, 65.9% of the Class of 2018 obtained full-time, long-term, bar passage-required employment nine months after graduation, excluding solo-practitioners, ranking 114th out of 200 ABA-approved law schools.

Academics

The student-faculty ratio is 6.8:1. In August 2013, by a near-unanimous vote, the faculty adopted a new curriculum to reflect changes in the legal profession. The model is designed to blend practice, theory, and professionalism in all three years of law school. Students begin working with clients in the first year of law school. Writing and skills-oriented courses track course content to the school's substantive-law courses to blend theory and practice. Students also learn transactional drafting, financial literacy, and statutory and regulatory analysis during their first year.

During the second year of law school, students specialize and continue to build on the skills they learned during their first year. The law school's concentrations include health care law, international law, national security law, and law, technology, and the arts.

Beginning in 2016, a capstone semester became a hallmark of the third year. All students practice law full-time by working on cases through the Milton A. Kramer Law Clinic Center at the law school or through an externship. Students may do externships in the U.S. or abroad. A select number of students may competitively apply to spend their third year in Europe, completing a foreign LLM degree in addition to their Case JD, at no additional cost.

Students learn leadership through courses developed by faculty at Case Western's Weatherhead School of Management, and students graduate with e-portfolios of their work to share with employers.

Admissions
For the class entering in 2022, the school accepted 39.18% of applicants and, from those accepted, 29.08% enrolled, with enrolled students having an average 160 LSAT score and 3.66 average undergraduate GPA.

Rankings
The school was ranked 78th by the U.S. News & World Report on its 2023 law school rankings. U.S. News & World Report has ranked its Health Care Law program ranked tied for 9th in the nation. In addition to its JD curriculum, the law school offers LLM and SJD degrees to foreign-trained lawyers. It also offers an Executive Master of Arts in Financial Integrity and a Masters in Patent Practice.

Journals

 Case Western Reserve Law Review
 Canada-US Law Journal
 Health Matrix: Journal of Law-Medicine
 Case Western Reserve Journal of Law, Technology & the Internet
 Case Western Reserve Journal of International Law

Academic centers
 Frederick K. Cox International Law Center
 Center for Law, Technology and the Arts
 The Law-Medicine Center
 Center for Business Law and Regulation
 Canada-US Law Institute

Post-graduation employment
According to Case Western Reserve's official 2018 ABA-required disclosures, 65.9% of the Class of 2018 obtained full-time, long-term, bar passage-required employment nine months after graduation, excluding solo-practitioners. The school ranked 114th out of 200 ABA-approved law schools in terms of the percentage of 2018 graduates with non-school-funded, full-time, long-term, bar passage required jobs nine months after graduation.

For 2021, Case Western Reserve's Law School Transparency under-employment score was 15%, indicating the percentage of the Class of 2021 unemployed, pursuing an additional degree, or working in a non-professional,  short-term, or part-time job nine months after graduation. 93.4% of the Class of 2021 was employed in some capacity including non-professional, part-time, and short-term employment, while 0.7% were pursuing graduate degrees, and 5.9% were unemployed nine months after graduation. The most graduates, 23.5%, were employed in public service.

Ohio was the primary employment destination for 2021 Case Western Reserve graduates, with 46.1% of employed graduates working in the state. The next two most popular locations for Case Western graduates to accept employment were nine graduates in Washington, D.C. and nine in New York. In addition, two graduates from the class of 2021 accepted positions abroad.

Costs
The total cost of attendance (indicating the cost of tuition, fees, and living expenses) at Case Western Reserve for the 2022-2023 academic year was $85,792. Case Western Reserve's tuition and fees on average increase 3.03% annually. The Law School Transparency estimated debt-financed cost of attendance for three years is $320,718, while 47.8% of students received an annual discount greater than or equal to $40,000.

Notable faculty
Jonathan H. Adler - A contributing editor to National Review Online and a regular contributor to The Volokh Conspiracy.
Michael Scharf - A recognized international expert on international criminal law and author of "Enemy of the State: The Trial and Execution of Saddam Hussein," Scharf serves as co-dean of the law school and is the director of the Frederick K. Cox International Law Center.
Henry T. King Jr. - A U.S. Prosecutor at the Nuremberg Trials in 1946-47. From the mid-1980s until his death in 2009 he was a professor at the law school. David M. Crane described King as "the George Washington of modern international law". 
Charles Korsmo - A former child actor turned lawyer and law professor.
Peter Junger - A computer law professor and Internet activist who was a professor at the law school from 1970-2001.

Notable graduates

Among Case Western alumni are prominent elected officials, particularly from the State of Ohio. Examples of such include current Ohio State Treasurer Josh Mandel, former Ohio Attorneys General Marc Dann, Lee Fisher, and Jim Petro, and former U.S. Representatives Stephanie Tubbs Jones and Ron Klein.

Members of the bench who are Case Western alumni include Kathleen M. O'Malley of the United States Court of Appeals for the Federal Circuit, and John J. McConnell, Jr. of the United States District Court for the District of Rhode Island. Both were appointed to their current positions by President Barack Obama.  Associate Justice John Hessin Clarke of the United States Supreme Court (from 1916 to 1922) was educated when the school was known as Western Reserve College.  Associate Justice Jeffrey Hjelm of the Maine Supreme Judicial Court is also an alumnus.

Other Case alumni are involved in the fields of government, business, academia, and the judiciary.

Government and politics
Ann Womer Benjamin, director of the Northeast Ohio Council on Higher Education, former director of the Ohio Department of Insurance
Justin Bibb, 58th and current Mayor of Cleveland
Oliver P. Bolton, former member of the U.S. House of Representatives, son of Representatives Chester Castle Bolton and Frances Payne Bolton
Elizabeth M. Boyer, lawyer, writer/publisher, and feminist founder of WEAL
Thomas A. Burke, former U.S. Senator and Mayor of Cleveland
Mohamed Ibn Chambas, Secretary-General, African, Caribbean and Pacific Group of States
Marc Dann, former Attorney General of Ohio
Lincoln Díaz-Balart, former member of the U.S. House of Representatives
Lee Fisher, former Attorney General of Ohio, former Lieutenant Governor of Ohio, and dean of Cleveland–Marshall College of Law as of 2016.
Herman Goldner, mayor of St. Petersburg, Florida, 1961-1967, 1971-1973
Tim Grendell, Ohio State Senator
Ray Gricar, former District Attorney of Centre County, Pennsylvania
Martin J. Gruenberg, chairman of the Federal Deposit Insurance Corporation
Thomas J. Herbert, former Governor of Ohio, Attorney General of Ohio, and Associate Justice of the Supreme Court of Ohio
Martin Hoke, former member of the U.S. House of Representatives
Stephanie Tubbs Jones, late judge, prosecutor and member of the U.S. House of Representatives
Ron Klein, former member of the U.S. House of Representatives
Donald L. Korb, former Internal Revenue Service Chief Counsel
William J. Laub, mayor of Akron, Ohio, professional football player, professional football coach
Claire Levy, executive director of the Colorado Center on Law and Policy and former member of the Colorado House of Representatives
Josh Mandel, Ohio State Treasurer
Capricia Marshall, former Chief of Protocol of the United States
Roscoe C. McCulloch, former U.S. Senator and member of the U.S. House of Representatives
Nicole Nason, former administrator, National Highway Traffic Safety Administration
Kevin G. Nealer, senior fellow, The Forum for International Policy
Jim Petro, former Attorney General of Ohio
John F. Sopko, Special Inspector General for Afghanistan Reconstruction
Charles W. Stage, former member of the Ohio House of Representatives
Michael Turner, member of the U.S. House of Representatives
Charles Vanik, former member of the U.S. House of Representatives
Wayne Wheeler, prominent prohibition leader and lobbyist/general counsel to the Anti-Saloon League
Charles Z. Wick, director of the USIA (existed from 1953 to 1999) under President Ronald Reagan
Stephen M. Young, former U.S. Senator
François-Philippe Champagne, Canadian Minister of Foreign Affairs

Business and industry
William Daroff, chief lobbyist for Jewish Federations of North America and appointee to US Commission for the Preservation of America's Heritage Abroad
Barry Meyer, former chairman of Warner Bros. Entertainment
Robert L. Stark (born 1951), American real estate developer and CEO of Stark Enterprises
Mark Weinberger, former chairman and CEO of Ernst & Young and former Assistant Secretary of the Treasury for Tax Policy
Jacob Frydman, real estate developer

Judicial
Susan G. Braden, former chief judge, United States Court of Federal Claims
Rebecca Dallet, Justice, Wisconsin Supreme Court
Emerich B. Freed, former judge, United States District Court for the Northern District of Ohio
Ben Charles Green, former judge, United States District Court for the Northern District of Ohio
Lynn B. Griffith, former justice, Supreme Court of Ohio (1962–64)
Jeffrey Hjelm, Justice, Maine Supreme Judicial Court
Alvin Krenzler, former judge, United States District Court for the Northern District of Ohio
Blanche Krupansky, former justice, Supreme Court of Ohio (1981–83)
Robert B. Krupansky, former judge, United States Court of Appeals for the Sixth Circuit
John James McConnell, Jr., District Judge for the United States District Court for the District of Rhode Island
Kathleen M. O'Malley, Circuit Judge for the United States Court of Appeals for the Federal Circuit
Edmund A. Sargus Jr., District Judge for the United States District Court for the Southern District of Ohio
Leslie Crocker Snyder, former judge, New York State Supreme Court (New York’s trial court), and former candidate for Manhattan District Attorney
Joseph F. Spaniol Jr., 18th Clerk of the Supreme Court of the United States
Don John Young, former judge, United States District Court for the Northern District of Ohio

Academia

Kenneth B. Davis, former dean of University of Wisconsin Law School
Amos N. Guiora, professor, S.J. Quinney College of Law, University of Utah
Kevin G. Nealer, professor, Georgetown School of Business, Fulbright Professor of trade law and policy in the People's Republic of China
Ted Gup, professor of journalism, Emerson College
Lee Fisher, dean, Cleveland-Marshall College of Law

Other
Nan Aron, public interest lawyer, civil rights advocate, and president of the Alliance for Justice
 Fred Gray, attorney to the Rev. Dr. Martin Luther King Jr., and Rosa Parks
Mike Lebowitz, attorney, legal pioneer in military expression, military law
Jeff Herman, church sex abuse attorney, Catholic Church sexual abuse cases
C.B. King, civil rights attorney in the South during the civil rights movement
Andrew Zashin, American Family Law attorney, legal writer and commentator. Adjunct Professor of Law at Case Western Reserve University School of Law

In popular culture
 In 2010, the show The Deep End on ABC features a main character, Addy Fisher, who graduated from CWRU School of Law.

References

External links

Law schools in Ohio
Case Western Reserve University
Educational institutions established in 1892
1892 establishments in Pennsylvania